An Caol, from the Gaelic for "narrow", may refer to:

 Caol (Scottish Gaelic: 'An Caol), a village in Scotland
 Keel, County Mayo (Irish Gaelic: An Caol), a town in Ireland